Sarkis Asatovich Sarchayan (born 1947), is a male former international table tennis player from Georgia. 

He won a silver medal at the 1975 World Table Tennis Championships in the mixed doubles with Elmira Antonyan.

See also
 List of table tennis players
 List of World Table Tennis Championships medalists

References

1947 births
Living people
Soviet table tennis players
World Table Tennis Championships medalists
Sportspeople from Batumi